Albert Braut Tjåland (anglicised to Tjaaland; born 11 February 2004) is a Norwegian football player who plays for Molde as a striker.

Club career 
Tjåland progressed through the ranks of Bryne, playing for their under-13 to under-19 teams. He debuted for Bryne 2 in the Norwegian third division on 19 October 2019, coming on as a substitute in a 7-2 home defeat against Viking 2. Due to his impressive goal-scoring ability in the youth teams, he began training with the first team and eventually made his debut on 2 March 2020 in a friendly game against Egersunds.

Following his prolific goal-scoring record of 69 goals in 48 games for Bryne's youth teams, Tjåland was signed by Molde during the summer of 2020. His impressive goal-scoring ability was noticed by various media outlets while at Molde, where he continued to score regularly for their youth teams, having scored more than a goal per game since his first appearance for Bryne under-13.

Tjåland's senior professional debut for Molde came on 25 July 2021, as a substitute in a 4-1 away victory against Spjelkavik in the Norwegian Cup. He replaced David Datro Fofana in the 83rd minute and only a few minutes later, scored his first goal.

Personal life 
Tjåland is maternal cousins with fellow professional footballers Erling Haaland, who plays for Manchester City, and Jonatan Braut Brunes, who plays for Strømsgodset.

Career statistics

Club

References

External links
 

2004 births
Living people
People from Time, Norway
Norwegian footballers
Association football forwards
Norway youth international footballers
Molde FK players
Bryne FK players
Norwegian Third Division players

Sportspeople from Rogaland